Lost in You may refer to:

 "Lost in You" (Three Days Grace song)
 "Lost in You" (Chris Gaines song)
 "Lost in You" (Shelly Poole song)
 "Lost in You" (Rod Stewart song)
 "Lost In You" (Lena Meyer-Landrut song)
 "Lost in You", a song by Westlife from Turnaround